Belá is a municipality and village in the Nové Zámky District in the Nitra Region of south-west Slovakia.

History
In historical records the village was first mentioned in 1138.

Geography
The village lies at an altitude of 187 metres and covers an area of 8.692 km². It has a population of about 418 people.

Ethnicity
The population is about 80% Hungarian and 20% Slovak .

Facilities
The village has a public library and football pitch.

Genealogical resources

The records for genealogical research are available at the state archive "Statny Archiv in Nitra, Slovakia"

 Roman Catholic church records (births/marriages/deaths): 1711-1898 (parish B)

See also
 List of municipalities and towns in Slovakia

External links
https://web.archive.org/web/20070427022352/http://www.statistics.sk/mosmis/eng/run.html
Surnames of living people in Bela
Belá – Nové Zámky okolie

Villages and municipalities in Nové Zámky District